Viewmont  Mall is a shopping mall located in Scranton, Pennsylvania. It is anchored by JCPenney, Macy's, Dick's Sporting Goods / Field & Stream, and HomeGoods.

History
Viewmont Mall cost $10 million to construct and the original anchors included Grant's, JCPenney and Sears. Sears opened first at the mall in February 1968, with JCPenney later opening in October. Grant's closed at the Viewmont Mall in 1976 and was replaced by Hess's the same year. Hess's built a larger store starting in 1987. Sears received major changes in 1993 that roughly doubled the store's size. Hess's closed in late summer 1994, and was replaced by Kaufmann's in Fall 1995. Viewmont, along with Wyoming Valley Mall was sold by Crown American to PREIT in 2003. Kaufmann's was renamed Macy's in September 2006.

The malls food court in 2014 received significant changes including the addition of Buffalo Wild Wings. Sears closed in mid-2016 and was demolished later in the year. PREIT knew Sears would not remain at the mall several years before its lease expired. Dick's Sporting Goods and Field & Stream were announced as Sears replacement in April 2016 with the dual store opening in September 2017. HomeGoods opened in August 2017 next to Field & Stream, on former Sears space. Dick's Sporting Goods and Field & Stream temporarily shut down at end of January 2023. The store was converted into a Dick’s House of Sport with an opening date scheduled for August.

References

External links
 Viewmont Mall official website
 Viewmont Mall - Pennsylvania Real Estate Investment Trust website

Shopping malls in Pennsylvania
Buildings and structures in Scranton, Pennsylvania
Tourist attractions in Lackawanna County, Pennsylvania
Shopping malls established in 1968
1968 establishments in Pennsylvania
Pennsylvania Real Estate Investment Trust